Kirschwasser (German for "cherry water") or kirsch is a clear, colorless brandy traditionally made from double distillation of morello cherries, a dark-colored cultivar of the sour cherry. It is now also made from other kinds of cherries. The cherries are fermented completely, including their stones. Unlike cherry liqueurs and cherry brandies, kirschwasser is not sweet. It is sometimes distilled from fermented cherry juice.

Serving
Kirschwasser is usually imbibed neat. It is traditionally served cold in a very small glass and is taken as an apéritif. It is an important ingredient in fondue. People in the German-speaking region where it originated usually serve it after dinner, as a digestif.

Kirschwasser is used in some cocktails, such as the Ladyfinger, the Florida, and the Rose.

Origin and production

Because morellos were originally grown in the Black Forest regions of Germany, kirschwasser is believed to have originated there. 
Kirschwasser is colourless because it is either not aged in wood or is aged in barrels made of ash. It may have been aged in paraffin-lined wood barrels or in earthenware vessels.'
Rivals in producing high quality "Kirsch" are Switzerland and Elsass (Alsace), the latter even has a kirschwasser route ("Route-du-pays-du-kirsch"), and other quality cherry production german speaking areas like South Tyrolia.
 
In France and in English-speaking countries, clear fruit brandies are known as eaux de vie. The European Union sets a minimum of 37.5% ABV (75 proof) for products of this kind; kirschwasser typically has an alcohol content of 40%–50% ABV (80–100 proof). About 10 kilograms (22 pounds) of cherries go into the making of a 750 ml bottle of kirschwasser.

Two Swiss varieties, Zuger Kirsch and Rigi Kirsch have been certified as AOP since 2013.

Chemical composition
Compared with brandy or whisky the characteristic features of kirsch are (a) that it contains relatively large quantities of higher alcohols and compound ethers, and (b) the presence in this spirit of small quantities of Hydrogen cyanide, partly as such and partly in combination as benzaldehyde-cyanhydrin, to which the distinctive flavour of kirsch is largely due.

Food

It is also commonly used in the dessert cherries jubilee.
 
It is used in traditional German  (Black Forest gateau) and in other cakes—for example in  cake.

Kirsch can also be used in the filling of chocolates. A typical kirsch chocolate consists of no more than one milliliter of kirsch, surrounded by milk or (more usually) dark chocolate with a film of hard sugar between the two parts. The hard sugar acts as an impermeable casing for the liquid content and also compensates for the lack of sweetness that is typical of kirsch. Swiss chocolatiers Lindt & Sprüngli and Camille Bloch, among others, manufacture these kirsch chocolates.

See also

Cherries jubilee
Liquor
Eau de vie
Fruit brandy
Himbeergeist
Liqueur
Schnapps
Culinary Heritage of Switzerland

References

External links

Cherry liqueurs and spirits
Fruit brandies
German distilled drinks
Culinary Heritage of Switzerland
Black Forest